John Finnegan may refer to:

 John Finnegan (explorer), Australian explorer and convict, marooned with Thomas Pamphlett
 John Finnegan (footballer), Scottish footballer 
 John Finnegan (The Bold and the Beautiful), a fictional character from the original CBS Daytime soap opera, The Bold and the Beautiful, played by actor Tanner Novlan.
 John P. Finnegan, American actor* John Finnegan (footballer), Scottish footballer 
John D. Finnegan, businessman
John J. Finnegan, American politician
John Lawrence Finnegan, actor
John Finnegan, character in Deep Rising

See also
John Finegan (disambiguation)